Camping Cosmos is a 1996 Belgian satirical comedy film and a sequel to La Vie sexuelle des Belges 1950-1978, directed by the same director: Jan Bucquoy. It stars Claude Semal, Lolo Ferrari (Miss Vandeputte), Noël Godin (Pierre Mertens), Herman Brusselmans (Herman) and Arno (Harry).

The movie's tagline is: Revolution, football, beer and frites. It is an unconventional and non-conformist story of the sexual habits of Belgians. Cosmos refers to the eternity of heaven in full contrast with this little campsite where so many people live together with their problems and limited view of the world. It also refers to the Russian cosmonauts who explored space, but who as communists did not believe in an afterworld. And last, the name of this Campsite Cosmos  is referring to the sky without limit above the heads of its residents. The picture became a cult film.

Plot
The summer of 1986. On a campsite at the Belgian coast - where everybody wants to live in complete freedom and forget the obligations of everyday life - Jan Bucquoy, the delegate of the Ministry of Culture, must bring culture nearer to the working class. He presents things like Bertolt Brecht's play, Mother Courage and Her Children or an interview with the famous writer Pierre Mertens, but the vacationers at this caravan park are more interested in low-brow distractions, like soccer, boxing matches or beauty contests, as well as sexual adventures and temporary romances. One of the actors is dressed up to resemble Tintin.

Cast
 Jean-Henri Compère as Jan Bucquoy 
 Fanny Hanciaux as Eve Bucquoy 
 Lolo Ferrari as Mme Vandeputte
 Jean-Paul Dermont as M. Vandeputte
 Noe Francq (credited as Noé Francq) as Noé Vandeputte 
 Claude Semal as Claude Semal dit Tintin
 Noël Godin as Pierre Mertens 
 Jacques Calonne as Jacques Calonne 
 Arno Hintjens (credited as Arno Hintjens Hintjens) as Arno 
 Herman Brusselmans as Herman 
 Jan Decleir as friend of Arno
 Patricia Dollez as Mme Janssens
 Sabrina Leurquin as Ulrique, la terroriste
 Catherine Claeys as Giselle Crapaud 
 Isabelle Legros as Isabelle Legros
 Jean Pierre Coopman

Production
The production was entirely in the hands of Transatlantic Films and its director Francis De Smet. Because of the refusal of the Flemish Government to raise the capital fund of the equivalent of 200.000 Euro at that time, the film had a substantial delay and was not ready in time for the Cannes Film Festival of 1996. This had consequences for the release later in Belgium. The film could not be released before 1997 in Paris.

Reception 
The film was at the origin of a controversy about the policy of Flemish state subsidizing films not least because of the presence of main actress Lolo Ferrari.

References

External links 
 
 Transatlantic Films Official Site
 The New York Times  review

1996 films
1996 comedy films
Belgian comedy films
Belgian independent films
Belgian satirical films
Belgian political satire films
1990s black comedy films
1990s crime comedy films
1990s French-language films
Dutch-language films
Films about vacationing
Films set on beaches
Films set in Belgium
Films shot in Belgium
Films set in 1986
Films directed by Jan Bucquoy
Tintin parodies